The Welsh Football League Division One 2019–20 season is the final season of this football league in South Wales. It is due to be replaced by the FAW League One for 2020–21. It is Tier 3 of the Welsh League Pyramid in South Wales.

After the season was cut short by the Coronavirus-19 pandemic the FAW confirmed its promotion and relegation decision on 16 June 2020.

The top 3 teams in the 2019–20 season have been promoted to the Cymru South. Which teams are due to make up the new FAW League One for the 2020–21 season are yet to be decided by the Football Association of Wales. A decision is expected in July 2020.

Member clubs for the final 2019–20 season

 Aberbargoed Buds
 Abergavenny Town
 AFC Llwydcoed
 Bridgend Street
 Caldicot Town
 Croesyceiliog
 Dinas Powys
 Garden Village
 Goytre 
 Monmouth Town
 Penydarren BGC 
 Pontardawe Town
 Port Talbot Town
 Risca United
 Ton Pentre 
 Trefelin BGC

League table

References

2019–20 in Welsh football
Welsh Football League Division One seasons